The Death of Nelson may refer to any of the following paintings depicting the death of Horatio Nelson, 1st Viscount Nelson:
 The Death of Nelson (West painting), an 1806 work by Benjamin West
 The Death of Nelson, 21 October 1805, an 1807 work by Arthur William Devis 
 The Death of Nelson (Maclise painting), an 1859–64 work by Daniel Maclise